Bucket and Cone refer to twin attributes that are frequently held in the hands of winged genies depicted in the art of Mesopotamia and within the context of Ancient Mesopotamian religion , particularly in art from the Neo-Assyrian Empire (911–605 BCE) and especially Assyrian palace reliefs from this period - sometimes, however, only the bucket is held, and the other hand is held up in what may be a blessing gesture. To a lesser degree such images were also depicted in images from the Neo-Sumerian Empire, Old Assyrian Empire, Babylonian Empire and Middle Assyrian Empire.

Context
These objects are often displayed in association with a stylised tree, before floral decorations, guardian figures, the king and/or his attendants and open doorways or portals. The cone was apparently held up in the right hand, the bucket held hanging downwards in the left hand of the figure, which is almost always that of a winged genie or an animal-headed demon or monster (though not necessarily with the same negative connotations); only very occasionally might these attributes be borne by a fully human figure.

Identity
As to the identity of the twin objects, the "cone" is generally recognised as a Turkish pine cone (Pinus brutia), common in Assyria, although other common identifications suggest the male inflorescence of the date palm (Phoenix dactylifera), or as a clay model imitating the form of one or the other. The bucket was presumably either of metal or basketry and is thought to have held either holy water or pollen, or perhaps both.

Uses
Although fully explanatory texts regarding these objects are exceedingly rare, it does seem highly likely that they were together employed in rituals of purification, as revealed by their Akkadian (Aka Assyrian, Babylonian) names: banduddû ("bucket") and mullilu ("purifier").  In this case the fir cone would be dipped in the bucket of water before being shaken in order to ritually purify a person or object. 

Alternatively the close association of the objects with depictions of stylised trees has led to the suggestion that it depicts fertilisation. In this case the pollen from the male flower of the date palm would be being shaken onto the tree.

References

Assyrian art and architecture
Ritual purification
Sculpture of the Ancient Near East
Religious iconography
Visual motifs